Baba Nazar may refer to:
 Baba Nazar, Hamadan
 Baba Nazar, Kurdistan
 Baba Nazar, West Azerbaijan
 Baba Nazar (book)